Irajatherium is an extinct genus of cynodonts, known only of the type species Irajatherium hernandezi. It is named in honor of Irajá Damiani Pinto.

Species 
Irajatherium hernandezi is a species known only by a humerus, a femur, two jaws and an upper arch incomplete, has the upper canine teeth after pills across and the post-mandibular canines with a more developed central cusp, followed by three smaller ones. It was collected in the Candelária Formation in the municipality of Faxinal do Soturno in the Paraná Basin of southeastern Brazil.

References

Bibliography

External links 
 Dinosaurs of Rio Grande do Sul
 Sociedade Brasileira de Paleontologia
 Figura

Tritheledontidae
Prehistoric cynodont genera
Carnian genera
Late Triassic synapsids of South America
Triassic Brazil
Fossils of Brazil
Paraná Basin
Fossil taxa described in 2005
Taxa named by José Bonaparte